Acacia burdekensis is a tree belonging to the genus Acacia and the subgenus Juliflorae that is native to north eastern Australia.

Description
Like most species of Acacia it has phyllodes rather than true leaves. The evergreen, glabrous phyllodes are straight to very falcate and are at their widest just below the middle. When it blooms it produces simple inflorescences along spikes with a length of  that are moderately packed with yellow flowers. After flowering it produces linear Seed pods that are slightly constricted between the seeds.

Distribution
It has only a limited range in northern parts of the Burdekin River watershed in Queensland where it is found on hillsides and along creek banks growing in stony and sandy soils.

See also
List of Acacia species

References

burdekensis
Flora of Queensland
Taxa named by Leslie Pedley
Plants described in 1999